The Lodi Public Schools are a comprehensive community public school district that serves students in pre-kindergarten through twelfth grade from Lodi, in Bergen County, New Jersey, United States.

As of the 2018–19 school year, the district, comprising seven schools, had an enrollment of 3,237 students and 231.0 classroom teachers (on an FTE basis), for a student–teacher ratio of 14.0:1.

The district is classified by the New Jersey Department of Education as being in District Factor Group "B", the second-lowest of eight groupings. District Factor Groups organize districts statewide to allow comparison by common socioeconomic characteristics of the local districts. From lowest socioeconomic status to highest, the categories are A, B, CD, DE, FG, GH, I and J.

Schools
Schools in the district (with 2018–19 enrollment data from the National Center for Education Statistics) are:
Elementary school 
Columbus Elementary School with 221 students in grades K-5
Vincent DiChiara, Principal
Hilltop Elementary School with 347 students in grades PreK-5
Glenn Focarino, Principal
Roosevelt Elementary School with 173 students in grades PreK-5
Jack Lipari, Principal
Washington Elementary School with 366 students in grades PreK-5
Kevin Dowson, Principal
Wilson Elementary School with 331 students in grades PreK-5
Christie Vanderhook, Principal
Middle school
Thomas Jefferson Middle School with 719 students in grades 6-8
Michael Cardone, Principal
High school
Lodi High School with 864 students in grades 9-12
Frank D'Amico, Principal

Administration
Core members of the district's administration are:
Dr. Douglas J. Petty, Superintendent of Schools
Robert Brown, Interim Business Administrator / Board Secretary

Board of education
The district's board of education, with nine members, sets policy and oversees the fiscal and educational operation of the district through its administration. As a Type II school district, the board's trustees are elected directly by voters to serve three-year terms of office on a staggered basis, with three seats up for election each year held (since 2013) as part of the November general election. The board appoints a superintendent to oversee the day-to-day operation of the district.

References

External links

 
School Data for the Lodi Public Schools, National Center for Education Statistics

Public Schools
School districts in Bergen County, New Jersey
New Jersey District Factor Group B